Raqqasan (also Romanized as Raqqāşān; also known as Gowhar Dasht) is a village in Zibad Rural District, Kakhk District, Gonabad County, Razavi Khorasan Province, Iran. At the 2006 census, its population was 140, in 55 families.

References 

Populated places in Gonabad County